Coban "The Cruncher" Lookchaomaesaitong (born August 4, 1966) is a Thai former Muay Thai kickboxer and World Champion. He won his first world title in 1985. He retired in 2000 after a 23-year career in Thailand and moved to New York to coach.  He formerly coached at New York Jiu Jitsu in lower Manhattan and Daddis Fight Camps in Philadelphia, Pennsylvania. Coban now splits his time between Buriram, Thailand at Camp Lookchaomaesaitong 
and Coban's Muay Thai Camp in New York City.

Biography

Young age

Coban was born as Banlu Anwiset in Buriram, Thailand, near the Cambodian border to a farmers' family of seven. One day while attending a local temple fair, he noticed that fighters were making what looked like easy money with their exhibitions. Seeing this as an opportunity to help his family, he resolved to become the best fighter in Thailand, and dreamed about fighting in Lumpinee stadium someday.

At 11, he started to train muay thai. With no money or resources, he made his own equipment by stuffing rice hulls and sawdust into canvas rice bags. Mimicking the moves of local fighters, he practiced daily after attending school and completing his farming chores. That same year he entered his first fight at a local temple, which resulted in a draw. The little money he earned went towards his family and education. Thus, his career was born.

It was at this time that Banlu acquired his fight name, "Coban," from a teacher of his who said that he looked like the actor Charles Bronson while riding on his Buffalo. At a later point in his career, American fans dubbed him Coban "The Cruncher."

Stardom
In 1978, while training at the recreational center, a ringside doctor named Sam Rhung Jong Gon noticed him. He was so impressed with Coban’s determination that he became his official sponsor and mentor. When Coban was 13, Doctor Gon sent him to a Muay Thai camp called Lookchamaesaitong where he trained for the next 9 years. By the age of 15, he had already fought more than 35 fights. At 19, Coban had won his first World Championship at Lumpinee stadium.

In 1990, Camp Lookchamaesaitong closed. To honor the camp, Coban adopted Lookchamaesaitong as his "fighting last name."

Coban fought more than 270 fights in his 23-year career. His last fight was against former student Danny Steele at the Warrior’s Cup in California in September 2000. Despite not having fought in 3 years, Coban won the match.

In 2010, Camp Lookchaomaesaitong in Buriram, Thailand, re-opened.  Camp owner, Mr. Nipon Chotison (Renowned and well-respected in the world of Muay Thai) and his son-in-law, Namkabuan Ratchapuekcafe (retired fighter) decided to re-open the original site after being closed for almost 20 years.  Coban has also joined the team, and their mission is to preserve the ancient and authentic art and lifestyle of Muay Thai.

The toughest fights of his career were against Ramon Dekkers. He fought him a total of four times, resulting in two wins and two losses. The Coban vs. Dekkers fights have been rated as the best by any standards, by Muay Thai fans worldwide.

Titles and accomplishments
 1985 Lumpinee Stadium 130 lbs Champion
 1990 Lumpinee Stadium 135 lbs Champion
 1991 WMTC World Super Lightweight Champion
 1992 IMF World Welterweight Champion

Fight record

|-  bgcolor="#CCFFCC"
| 2000-09-09 || Win ||align=left| Danny Steele || Warriors Cup of America || Irvine, California, United States || Decision (Split) || 5 || 3:00
|-
! style=background:white colspan=9 |
|-  bgcolor="#CCFFCC"
| ? || Win ||align=left| Tony Carr || World Championship Kickboxing ||  United States || KO (Low kick) || 3 || 
|-
! style=background:white colspan=9 |
|-
|-  bgcolor="#FFBBBB"
| 1998-09-25 || Loss ||align=left| Malik Borbashev || Draka VI || Los Angeles, California, United States || TKO (Retirement) || 7 || 0:00
|-
|-  bgcolor="#FFBBBB"
| 1998-07-07 || Loss ||align=left| Manson Gibson || Crystal Park Casino Outdoor Show || Los Angeles, CA, USA || TKO (Right Back Kick) || 5 || 1:59
|-
! style=background:white colspan=9 |
|-
|-  bgcolor="#FFBBBB"
| 1998-05-24 || Loss ||align=left| Malik Borbashev || Draka V || Los Angeles, California, United States || Decision (Unanimous) ||  || 
|-
! style=background:white colspan=9 |
|-
|-  bgcolor="#fbb"
| 1996- || Loss||align=left| Guillaume Kerner || || Los Angeles, United States || Decision || 5 || 3:00
|-
! style=background:white colspan=9 |
|-  bgcolor="#fbb"
| ? || Loss ||align=left| Orono Por Muang Ubon ||  || Thailand || Decision  || 5 || 3:00
|-  bgcolor="#CCFFCC"
| 1994-08-03 || Win ||align=left| Dany Bill || Lumpinee Stadium || Bangkok, Thailand || Decision || 5 || 3:00
|-
|-  bgcolor="#CCFFCC"
| 1994 || Win ||align=left| Hector Pena ||  ||  || KO (Left Hook) || 2 || 
|-
! style=background:white colspan=9 |

|-
|-  style="background:#CCFFCC;"
| 1993-02-14 || Win ||align=left| Dida Diafat || Thai Boxing World Championship || Brest, France || Decision (Unanimous) || 5 || 3:00
|-

|-  bgcolor="#FFBBBB"
| 1993 || Loss ||align=left| Ramon Dekkers ||  || France || Decision(Unanimous) || 5 || 3:00

|-  bgcolor="#CCFFCC"
| 1992-10-03 || Win ||align=left| Jo Prestia ||  || Levallois-Perret, France || Decision || 5 || 3:00 
|-
! style=background:white colspan=9 |

|-  style="background:#fbb;"
| 1992-05-30 || Loss ||align=left| Superlek Sorn E-Sarn || Lumpinee Stadium || Bangkok, Thailand || Decision || 5 || 3:00
|-  bgcolor="#CCFFCC"
| 1992-02-28 || Win ||align=left| Ramon Dekkers ||  || Samut Prakan, Thailand || Decision (Unanimous) || 5 || 3:00
|-
! style=background:white colspan=9 |
|-  bgcolor="#CCFFCC"
| ? || Win ||align=left| Joao Vieira || Lumpinee Stadium || Bangkok, Thailand || Decision  || 5 || 3:00
|-  bgcolor="#CCFFCC"
| 1992-02-08|| Win ||align=left| Samransak Muangsurin ||Lumpinee Stadium || Bangkok, Thailand || KO  || 2 ||
|-
|-  bgcolor="#fbb"
| 1991-11-|| Loss||align=left| Nongmoon Chomphutong || Lumpinee Stadium || Bangkok, Thailand || Decision || 5 || 3:00 
|-
! style=background:white colspan=9 |
|-  bgcolor="#fbb"
| 1991-|| Loss||align=left| Sakmongkol Sithchuchok || Lumpinee Stadium || Bangkok, Thailand || Decision || 5 || 3:00
|-  bgcolor="#CCFFCC"
| 1991-|| Win ||align=left| Nuenthong Senkiri ||Lumpinee Stadium || Bangkok, Thailand || KO  || 2 ||
|-  bgcolor="#FFBBBB"
| 1991-08-06 || Loss ||align=left| Ramon Dekkers || Lumpinee Stadium || Bangkok, Thailand || KO (Punches) || 1 ||
|-  bgcolor="#CCFFCC"
| 1991-07-02|| Win ||align=left| Chanchai Sor Tamarangsri ||Lumpinee Stadium || Bangkok, Thailand || KO  || 1 ||
|-
|-  style="background:#CCFFCC;"
| 1991 || Win ||align=left| Dida Diafat || World Muaythai Championship || || Decision (Unanimous) || 5 || 3:00
|-
! style=background:white colspan=9 |
|-  bgcolor="#CCFFCC"
| 1991|| Win ||align=left| Humphfrey Harrison || || Netherlands ||  Decision || 5 || 3:00
|-
! style=background:white colspan=9 |

|-  bgcolor="#CCFFCC"
| 1991|| Win ||align=left| Bandong Sitbangprachan || |Lumpinee Stadium || Bangkok, Thailand || KO  || 2 ||
|-
! style=background:white colspan=9 |

|-  bgcolor="#CCFFCC"
| 1991-05-31|| Win ||align=left| Samransak Muangsurin ||Lumpinee Stadium || Bangkok, Thailand || KO  || 3 ||
|-  bgcolor="#CCFFCC"
| 1991-04-21 || Win ||align=left| Ramon Dekkers || IKL || Paris, France || KO (Left hook) || 1 || 1:00
|-  bgcolor="#cfc"
| 1991- || Win||align=left| Chombueng Chor.Waikul ||  || New Zealand || TKO|| 4 ||
|-  bgcolor="#cfc"
| 1991- || Win||align=left| Noppadet Sor.Samruang ||  || Ayutthaya, Thailand || Decision || 5 || 3:00
|-  bgcolor="#CCFFCC"
| 1990-07-29|| Win ||align=left| Oliver Harrison || || England || TKO (Referee Stoappge)  || 5 ||
|-
! style=background:white colspan=9 |
|-  bgcolor="#fbb"
|  1990-06-30|| Loss||align=left| Tantawannoi Sitsilachai || Lumpinee Stadium || Bangkok, Thailand || Referee stoppage|| 4 ||

|-  bgcolor="#CCFFCC"
| 1990-05-27 || Win ||align=left| Tommy van de Berg || Holland vs Thailand || Amsterdam, Netherlands || KO (Left Hook) || 1 ||
|-
|-  bgcolor="#fbb"
| 1990-03- || Loss ||align=left| Boonchai ThanatuwanonEkamit ||  || Thailand || Decision || 5 || 3:00

|-  bgcolor="#fbb"
| 1989-12-01 || Loss ||align=left| BanDon Sit BangPrachan || || Ubon, Thailand || KO  || 4 ||

|-  bgcolor="#CCFFCC"
| 1989-11-04 || Win ||align=left| Chombueng Chor.Waikul || || Sisaket, Thailand || Decision  || 5 || 3:00

|-  bgcolor="#CCFFCC"
| 1989-10-29 || Win ||align=left| Sornarin Welnakhompathom || || Nakhon Pathom, Thailand || KO  || 4 ||

|-  bgcolor="#c5d2ea"
| 1989-10- || Draw ||align=left| Saksit Muangsurin || || Buriram, Thailand || Decision || 5 || 3:00

|-  bgcolor="#CCFFCC"
| 1989-07-01 || Win ||align=left| Buakaew Kiatlansang || || Thailand || Decision || 5 || 3:00

|-  bgcolor="#CCFFCC"
| 1989-06-10 || Win ||align=left| Palannoi Kiatanan || || Thailand || KO || 2 ||

|-  bgcolor="#CCFFCC"
| 1989-05-18 || Win ||align=left| Sornarin Welnakhompathom || || Mueang Chanthaburi, Thailand || Decision  || 5 ||3:00

|-  bgcolor="#CCFFCC"
| 1989-04-24 || Win ||align=left| Kongkiat Sor.Jimmanchof || || Sisaket, Thailand || KO || 3 ||

|-  bgcolor="#CCFFCC"
| 1989-04-12 || Win ||align=left| Chombueng Chor. Waikul || || Korat, Thailand || Decision || 5 || 3:00

|-  bgcolor="#fbb"
| 1989-03-31 || Loss ||align=left| Boonchai Huasai Gym || || Pattani, Thailand || Decision  || 5 || 3:00

|-  bgcolor="#CCFFCC"
| 1989-03-04 || Win ||align=left| Saksit Muangsurin || Omnoi Stadium|| Samut Sakhon, Thailand || KO  || 4 ||

|-  bgcolor="#CCFFCC"
| 1989-01-07 || Win ||align=left| Samart Fairtex || Omnoi Stadium|| Samut Sakhon, Thailand || KO  || 3 ||

|-  bgcolor="#CCFFCC"
|  || Win ||align=left| Barndon Sitbangprachan || || Thailand || KO  ||  ||
|-  bgcolor="#CCFFCC"
|  || Win ||align=left| Fallanoi Kietanan || || Thailand || KO  ||  ||
|-  bgcolor="#cfc"
| 1987-05-19 || Win||align=left| Taunting Sityodtong || Rangsit Stadium || Rangsit, Thailand || Decision || 5 || 3:00
|-  bgcolor="#fbb"
| 1987-01-23 || Loss ||align=left| Phayapung Ekamit || Rangsit Stadium || Rangsit, Thailand || Decision || 5 || 3:00
|-
! style=background:white colspan=9 |
|-  bgcolor="#c5d2ea"
| 1986-11-28 || Draw||align=left| Ritthichai Singkhiri || Rangsit Stadium || Rangsit, Thailand || Decision || 5 || 3:00
|-  bgcolor="#cfc"
| 1986-09-26 || Win||align=left| Lamkhong Sitwaiwat || Rangsit Stadium || Rangsit, Thailand || KO|| 3 || 
|-  bgcolor="#fbb"
| 1986-08-08 || Loss||align=left|  Tantawannoi Sitsilachai || Rangsit Stadium || Rangsit, Thailand || TKO (Doctor stoppage)|| 3 ||

|-  bgcolor="#CCFFCC"
| 1986-07-04|| Win ||align=left| Saksit Muangsurin || || Ubon Ratchathani, Thailand || KO  || 4 ||
|-  bgcolor="#fbb"
|  || Loss||align=left| Tantawannoi Sitsilachai ||  || Thailand || ||  || 
|-  bgcolor="#fbb"
|  || Loss||align=left| Tantawannoi Sitsilachai ||  || Thailand || ||  || 
|-  bgcolor="#fbb"
|  || Loss||align=left| Tantawannoi Sitsilachai ||  || Thailand || ||  || 
|-
| colspan=9 | Legend:

See also
Muay Thai
List of K-1 events
List of male kickboxers

External links
 https://archive.today/20130222005631/http://www.muaythaionline.net/features/cobaninterview.html
 http://www.teamcoban.com 
 https://web.archive.org/web/20110307114853/http://www.siamfightmag.com/interviews/interviews_anglais/coban_lookchaomaesaitong/interview_coban_lookchaomaesaitong.html
 http://lookchaomaesaitong.com/index.php

References

1966 births
Living people
Lightweight kickboxers
Coban Lookchaomaesaitong
Coban Lookchaomaesaitong